The 2022–23 Iranian Futsal Super League is the 24th season of the Iran Pro League and the 19th under the name Futsal Super League. Giti Pasand are the defending champions. The season will feature 12 teams from the 2021–22 Super League and two new teams promoted from the 2021–22 Iran Futsal's 1st Division.

Teams

Stadiums and locations

Personnel

Number of teams by region

League table 

</noinclude><noinclude>

Results

Positions by round

Clubs season-progress

Awards 

 Winner: 
 Runners-up: 
 Third-Place: 
 Top scorer: 
 Best Player: 
 Best Manager: 
 Best Goalkeeper: 
 Best Team: 
 Fairplay Man: 
 Best Referee:

References 

Iranian Futsal Super League seasons